Hans Rudolf Zöbeley (27 May 1931 in Mannheim – 5 December 2007 in Garmisch-Partenkirchen) was a German composer, choral conductor and Lutheran church musician.

The son of the Baden minister and hymn composer Rudolf Zöbeley (1901–1991) and Martha Bälz, he studied classical philology and medieval studies at the Ruprecht Karl University of Heidelberg and musicology at the Kirchenmusikalisches Institut Heidelberg. In 1955 he passed the state examination in Heidelberg, 1957, the A-Prüfung as a full-time church musician. In 1963 he completed his doctorate under Thrasyboulos Georgiades (1907–1977) in Munich with a thesis on the music of the Buxheim Organ Book. In 1962 he was appointed to the faculty at the Richard Strauss Conservatory in Munich, and in 1979 appointed music director of the Ludwig Maximilian University of Munich.

Zöbeley played a key role in three choirs: in 1960 he founded the Munich Motet Choir which he led almost forty years until his retirement in 1998. In addition, from 1962 to 1980 he was at the head of the choir of the Munich Philharmonic. From 1969 to 2002 he was artistic and musical director of the Munich University Choir. He was also, from the summer of 1997, active as church music director at the Church of St. Matthew, Munich, the base of the bishop of the Evangelical Lutheran Church in Bavaria.

His son is the early music specialist and choral conductor Martin Zöbeley, leader of Gruppe für Alte Musik München.

References

1931 births
2007 deaths
Musicians from Mannheim
German choral conductors
German male conductors (music)
20th-century German conductors (music)
20th-century German male musicians
Kirchenmusikdirektor